John Robert Colombo, CM (born March 24, 1936) is a Canadian author, editor, and poet.  He has published over 200 titles, including major anthologies and reference works.

Early life
Colombo was born in Kitchener, Ontario, in 1936. He attended the University of Toronto, where he began to organize literary events in the late 1950s.  He began writing and publishing poetry in the early 1960s; his first book of poetry Lines for the Last Days was illustrated by William Kurelek. His imprint Hawkshead Press published Margaret Atwood's first collection of poetry in 1963. He also facilitated the appearance of first books of fiction written by Hugh Hood and Alice Munro and the first mass-market publication of a science-fiction story by Robert J. Sawyer. He served as literary manager of the old Bohemian Embassy in Toronto and wrote poetry and also pioneered "found poetry" in the country. He then moved into editorial positions with some of Toronto's large publishing houses, including McClelland and Stewart and Hurtig.  During that period, he edited George Grant's Lament for a Nation, and served as managing editor of the Tamarack Review, at the time the leading literary quarterly.

Writing career
In the early 1970s, Colombo began working on the first of many anthologies, a collection of quotations from prominent Canadians titled Colombo's Canadian Quotations. Following the success of the quotations collection, Colombo went on to publish dozens of collections, ranging from bibliographies of Canadian reference works to collections of folk tales, stories of the paranormal, and UFO sightings.  As of 2014, Colombo has published over 200 titles, making him the second-most prolific author in Canadian literary history. His anthology writing earned him the nickname "the Master Gatherer" amongst Canadian writers and literary critics. He has also been dubbed "Canada's Mr. Mystery" for his compilations of the paranormal. In the 1990s, Colombo began publishing his writing through his own imprint, Colombo and Company.

Works

Recognition 

Harbourfront International Literary Award
Honorary doctorate in literature by York University
Member of the Order of Canada
The Centennial Medal
The Order of Cyril and Methodius (first class)
Esteemed Knight of Mark Twain
A Fellow, Northrop Frye Centre, Victoria College, University of Toronto.

See also

Canadian literature
Canadian poetry
List of Canadian poets

References

External links
 
 Canada Vignettes: Riverdale Lion, a 1979 visual interpretation by the NFB of the Colombo poem

20th-century Canadian poets
20th-century Canadian male writers
Canadian male poets
Canadian humorists
Canadian folklorists
Members of the Order of Canada
1936 births
Living people
University of Toronto alumni
Harbourfront Festival Prize winners
Canadian book editors
Canadian anthologists
21st-century Canadian poets
Writers from Kitchener, Ontario
21st-century Canadian male writers
Canadian male non-fiction writers